David Taylor (born 29 July 1943) is an English former professional snooker player. He won the World and English Amateur Championships in 1968, before the success of those wins encouraged him to turn professional. He was nicknamed "The Silver Fox" because of his prematurely grey hair.

Career

Taylor reached three major finals, but lost them all. The first was the 1978 UK Championship in 1978 (he lost to Doug Mountjoy 9–15). Then, in 1981, he lost to Steve Davis in the Yamaha Organs Trophy (later the British Open) 6–9, and he lost 6–9 to Tony Knowles in the 1982 Jameson International. The last of these was his only ranking event final; the others would be ranking events in the future but were not at the time he reached the final. In the quarter-finals of this event he beat the then World Champion, Steve Davis 5–3. Three times a defeated quarter-finalist, his best performance in the World Championship was at the 1980 event, when he lost to Cliff Thorburn 7–16 in the semi-final having beaten the number one seed and 6 times World Champion Ray Reardon 13–11 in the quarter-final. His only major tournament win was with Steve Davis and John Spencer during the 1981 State Express World Team Classic for the England team.
He was a member of the elite Top 16 World Rankings for 10 consecutive years until the 1985/86 season, reaching a high of No 7 in the 1981/82 season.

He made a surprise return to enter the 2010 World Snooker Championship qualifying rounds, aged 66 but lost to Paul Wykes 1–5 in Match 2 on 26 February 2010.

Outside snooker
He was one of the two commentators during Steve Davis' first televised maximum break. After his career wound down he ran an award-winning hotel.

He currently runs Ash Farm Country Guest House with his wife in Little Bollington near Altrincham in Cheshire.

He was the first snooker player to pot all balls in the final round of BBC snooker gameshow Big Break.

Performance and rankings timeline

Career finals

Ranking finals: 1

Non-ranking finals: 4 (1 title)

Team finals: 1 (1 title)

Amateur finals: 2 (2 titles)

References

English snooker players
People from Altrincham
1943 births
Living people